Foundation and Earth is a science fiction novel by American writer Isaac Asimov, the fifth novel of the Foundation series and chronologically the last in the series. It was published in 1986, four years after the first sequel to the Foundation trilogy, which is titled Foundation's Edge.

Plot introduction
Several centuries after the events of Second Foundation, two citizens of the Foundation search for Earth, the legendary planet where humans are said to have originated.  Even less is known about Earth than was the case in Foundation, when scholars still seem to know the location of 'Sol'.

The story follows on from Foundation's Edge, but can be read as a complete work in itself.  (It does, however, give away most of the mysteries around which Foundation's Edge is built.)

Plot summary

Part I: Gaia
Councilman Golan Trevize, historian Janov Pelorat, and Blissenobiarella of the planet Gaia (introduced in Foundation's Edge) set out on a journey to find humanity's ancestral planet—Earth. The purpose of the journey is to settle Trevize's doubt of his decision, at the end of Foundation's Edge, to embrace the all-encompassing noosphere of Galaxia.

Part II: Comporellon
First, they visit Comporellon, which claims to be the oldest currently inhabited planet in the galaxy. Upon arrival, they are imprisoned, but negotiate their way out. While there, a historian gives them the coordinates of three Spacer planets, surmised to be fairly close to Earth.

Part III: Aurora
The first Spacer planet they visit is Aurora, where Trevize is nearly killed by a pack of wild dogs, presumed to be the descendants of household pets reverted to wolf-like savagery. They escape when Bliss manipulates the dogs' emotions to psychologically compel a retreat, amplifying the fear induced by cries from one of the dogs that Trevize used his neuronic whip on.

Part IV: Solaria
Next, they visit Solaria, where they find that the Solarians, who have survived the Spacer-Settler conflicts by clever retreat detailed in Asimov's novel Robots and Empire, have engineered themselves into self-reproducing hermaphrodites, generally intolerant of human physical presence or contact. They have also given themselves a natural ability to mentally channel ("transduce") great amounts of energy, and use this as their sole source of power. The Solarians intentionally avoid ever having to interact with each other, except by holographic apparatus ("viewing"), and reproduce only when necessary to replace the dead. Bliss, Pelorat, and Trevize are nearly killed by the Solarian Sarton Bander; but Bliss deflects the transduction at the moment Bander uses it as a weapon, accidentally killing Bander. While escaping, they acquire Bander's immature child, Fallom, in a state of panic because its robotic nursemaid, like all other robots on the estate, has lost power and stopped functioning due to the death of its master, and carry her (Bliss, by preference, uses a feminine pronoun on Fallom) aboard their ship to prevent her execution by the Solarians - she would be surplus to their population requirements, and a more mature child from another state would be chosen to take over Bander's estate.

Part V: Melpomenia
The crew now visit Melpomenia, the third and final Spacer coordinate they have, where the atmosphere has become reduced to a few thousandths of normal atmospheric pressure. Wearing space suits, they enter a library, and find a plaque listing the names and coordinates of all fifty Spacer worlds.  On the way back to the ship, they notice a moss has begun to grow around the seals of their space suits, and just in time, surmise that the moss is feeding on minuscule leakages of carbon dioxide. Thus, they are able to eradicate the moss with a blaster and heavy UV-illumination so that no spores are unintentionally carried off the planet. They then plot the Spacer worlds, which form a rough sphere, on the ship's map and conclude that the location of Earth must be near to the center of the sphere. This area turns out to have a binary star system.

Part VI: Alpha
They arrive at the planet Alpha, which orbits Alpha Centauri and is all ocean except for an island 250 km long and 65 km wide on which live a small group of humans.  In a reference to the radioactive Earth of Asimov's novel Pebble in the Sky, the restoration of Earth's soil was eventually abandoned in favour of resettling the population to "New Earth", which the First Galactic Empire had already been terraforming. The natives appear friendly, but secretly they intend to kill the visitors with a microbiological agent to prevent them from informing the rest of the galaxy of their existence. They are warned to escape before the agent can be activated, by a native woman who has formed an attraction to Trevize and was impressed by Fallom's ability to play a flute with just her mind. Now certain that Alpha Centauri is not Earth but near it, they approach a system close by and are puzzled by the very strong similarities between this star and the larger sun of the Alpha Centauri system.  Asimov here is making use of an astronomical curiosity: the nearest star system to Sol contains a star that has the same spectral type, G2 V, though Alpha Centauri A is a little larger and brighter.

Part VII: Earth
On the approach to Earth, they detect it to be highly radioactive and not capable of supporting life but, while trying to use the ship's computer to locate Solaria, Fallom calls Trevize's attention to the moon, which is large enough to serve as a hideout for the forces that lived on Earth. There, they find R. Daneel Olivaw, who explains he has been paternalistically manipulating humanity since Elijah Baley's time, long before the Galactic Empire or Foundation. He thus caused the settlement of Alpha Centauri, the creation of Gaia and the creation of psychohistory (detailed in Prelude to Foundation and Forward the Foundation), and manipulated Trevize into making his decision at the end of Foundation's Edge (although he did not manipulate the decision itself). It is revealed that Daneel's positronic brain is deteriorating and he is unable to design a new brain, as he had done several times before, since his brain is now too fragile; he therefore wishes to merge Fallom's brain with his own, allowing him time to oversee Galaxia's creation.

Daneel continues to explain that human internal warfare or parochialism was the reason for his causing the creation of psychohistory and Gaia. Trevize then confirms his decision that the creation of Galaxia is the correct choice, and gives his reason as the likelihood of advanced life beyond the galaxy eventually attacking humanity. Trevize states that there should be enough time for Galaxia to be fully ready as long as the enemy is not already present among them, not noticing Fallom's alien gaze resting unfathomably upon him.

Relationship with other works
Although hinted at in Foundation's Edge, this book was the first book of the series that merged it with Asimov's Robot series. The radioactive-Earth theme was begun in Pebble in the Sky, which is set thousands of years earlier. R. Daneel Olivaw's role in the events of that novel would later be described in the prequels.

This book serves as a kind of epilogue to the Robot series. Asimov describes what has become of the Spacer worlds of Solaria and Aurora, described extensively in The Naked Sun and the Robots of Dawn, respectively.  The author also reveals what has happened to Earth, as described in Robots and Empire.

The book Nemesis, predating the timeline and events found in the Foundation and Robot series, hints at the motives and origins of Gaia.  Humans had a very early contact with the sentient moon Erythro, a very abstract alien intelligence.

In Foundation's Triumph, the last book in the Second Foundation Trilogy authorized by Asimov's estate, another possible future for the Galaxy is discussed. In a conversation between Hari Seldon and Daneel Olivaw, Seldon discusses the possibility that the Foundation will in fact incorporate Gaia into the Second Galactic Empire. He then bets that in a thousand years, well after Galaxia should have been established and removed the need for formal education, editions of the Encyclopedia Galactica will be published. The fact that two versions of the Encyclopedia are published after this deadline seems to lend credence to the view that Seldon won the bet.

Reception
Dave Langford reviewed Foundation and Earth for White Dwarf #84, and stated that "Whopping concepts and evocative descriptions boost the novel half-way to excellence, but are defeated by the dead-weight of the stereotypes and lecturing. Hard SF fans will forgive its flaws."

Reviews
Review by Dan Chow (1986) in Locus, #309 October 1986
Review by Gene DeWeese (1986) in Science Fiction Review, Winter 1986
Review by Elton T. Elliott (1986) in Science Fiction Review, Winter 1986
Review by Don D'Ammassa (1987) in Science Fiction Chronicle, #88 January 1987
Review by Donald M. Hassler (1987) in Fantasy Review, January-February 1987
Review by Jon Wallace (1954 -) (1987) in Vector 136
Review by Darrell Schweitzer (1987) in Aboriginal SF, February-March 1987
Review by Everett F. Bleiler [as by E. F. Bleiler] (1987) in Rod Serling's The Twilight Zone Magazine, April 1987
Review by Thomas A. Easton [as by Tom Easton] (1987) in Analog Science Fiction/Science Fact, May 1987
Review [French] by Jonathan Dornet (1987) in A&A, #108-109
Review by John Newsinger (1987) in Paperback Inferno, #68
Review by Doug Fratz (1987) in Thrust, #26, Spring 1987
Review [Portuguese] by Roberto de Sousa Causo (1990) in Isaac Asimov magazine, #07

References

External links
 
 
 Foundation and Earth at Worlds Without End

1986 American novels
1986 science fiction novels
Foundation universe books
Science fiction novels by Isaac Asimov
Doubleday (publisher) books
Xenoarchaeology in fiction

sv:Stiftelseserien#Stiftelsen och jorden